Sprocket hole photography is a style of photography that exposes the full width of 35 mm film, creating a photograph punctuated by the "sprocket holes" (perforations) along the edges of the film.  Usually, this style involves the use of a modified medium format camera, since a 35 mm camera ordinarily will not expose the edges of the film.

External links

35mm Sprocket Holes group on Flickr
35mm Sprocket Holes group on Deviant-Art

Photographic techniques